Halvdan is a masculine given name. Notable people with the name include:

Halvdan Aarsrud (1878–1925), Norwegian bailiff and politician for the Labour Party
Halvdan the Black (c. 810 – c. 860), ninth-century king of Vestfold
Halvdan Wexelsen Freihow (1883–1965), Norwegian priest and culturist
Halvdan (runemaster), runemaster in mid-11th century Södermanland, Sweden
Lie, Trygve Halvdan (1896–1968), Norwegian politician, labour leader, government official and author
Halvdan Holbø (1907–1995), Norwegian painter
Halvdan Koht (1873–1965), Norwegian historian and politician representing the Labour Party
Halvdan Ljøsne (1929–2006), Norwegian painter
Halvdan Sivertsen (born 1950), Norwegian singer-songwriter and guitarist
Halvdan Skard (born 1939), Norwegian politician for the Labour Party
Halvdan Eyvind Stokke (1900–1977), Norwegian railway director and politician

See also
Aldan (disambiguation)
Alvan (disambiguation)
Avdan (disambiguation)
Halda
Haldan (disambiguation)
Halva
Halvan (disambiguation)

Masculine given names
Norwegian masculine given names